Hina Spani (15 February 189011 July 1969) was an Argentine soprano. Her real name was Higinia Tuñón and she enjoyed a major opera career centred on Italy during the 1920s and 1930s.

Overview 
Spani was born in Puán, Province of Buenos Aires, an old town located in the pampas of Argentina. When it was discovered that she had a clear, pleasing voice, a landowner from the vicinity of her home town agreed to help her to meet the costs of studying voice, first in Buenos Aires with Amanda Campodónico and later in Milan with Vittorio Moratti.

She made her operatic début at La Scala, Milan, in 1915, in the secondary rôle of Anna in Alfredo Catalani's La Wally. She sang regularly at La Scala—Italy's most important theatre—and in all the leading Italian theaters until 1934. She also toured Australia with a first-rate troupe composed of some of La Scala's leading singers.

At the Teatro Colón she was heard between 1915 and 1940, creating the title part in the world première of Respighi's Maria Egiziaca in 1934, as well as several operas by Argentine composers. She sang over 70 rôles ranging from Ottavia in Monteverdi's 17th century opera L'incoronazione di Poppea to works by then living composers.

After retiring from the operatic stage, she taught at the Vocal Art Institut of the Teatro Colón, which she directed.

Spani died in Buenos Aires on 11 July 1969.

Recordings 
Spani made some 40 sides for the Italian Columbia and HMV recording companies. Reissues of her best 78-rpm records can be heard on excellent CDs produced by the Preiser and Pearl labels. Marston Records have also reissued in 2CD their complete recordings.

Appreciation 
Spani's style and technique were typical of a Latin soprano of the 1920-1945 period, but her rich tone was much smoother and her musicianship more subtle than that of most of her contemporaries. She was an outstanding spinto with a constant appreciation of the expressive limits of the music that she sang; as a result, she invested her operatic interpretations with a unique combination of intensity and restraint.

Inter-war opera-goers spoke admiringly of the "grand", expansive quality that her voice possessed when it was experienced in the acoustics of a theatre as opposed to a boxy recording studio. She also had a vast concert repertory which she had been encouraged to acquire by her first teacher in Buenos Aires. Very little of this is documented on record (although she did leave a handful of lovely song recordings), but those who saw her in recital remembered the joy that she communicated. In this respect, she was a real cosmopolitan artist.

References 
 Harold Rosenthal and John Warrack; The Concise Oxford Dictionary of Opera, second edition, London, 1980.
 J.B. Steane; The Grand Tradition, London, 1974.

External links
  Teatro Colon Annals
 The Complete Recordings of Hina Spani - Marston Records

1890 births
1969 deaths
Argentine operatic sopranos
20th-century Argentine women opera singers
People from Buenos Aires Province